Universal TV (formerly Hallmark Channel and Universal Channel) is an Australian cable and satellite television channel, owned and operated by NBCUniversal International Networks. It has been available on most subscription television platforms in Australia since 1998.

History

The channel was added to Austar in April 1999.

On 1 July 2010 the Hallmark Channel rebranded as the Universal Channel. This rebrand saw the slogan In every life there is drama replaced with Characters Welcome as well as the channel converting from 4:3 aspect ratio to 16:9 widescreen picture format. It brought the introduction of new series, including two Australian premiere series, as well as returning to first seasons of almost all programs already aired.

On 1 February 2015, Universal Channel launched on Australian IPTV service Fetch TV.

2014 channel rebranding 
On 1 January 2014 the Universal Channel rebranded itself alongside other transformations to the Foxtel platform. Among the changes under the rebrand included the channel aligning itself with the international logo and slogan 100% Characters, launching Australian premiere series The Michael J. Fox Show, The Night Shift and the US adaptation of Rake and inherited series from the closure of TV1 including 30 Rock, Covert Affairs, Suits, Law & Order: SVU and Law & Order: CI. In addition to the closure of TV1, this influx of programming was attributed to the end of the output agreement between NBCUniversal and Seven Network in mid 2013, allowing for more programming opportunities for Universal Channel.

Additionally, Universal Channel moved to the basic tier of the Foxtel platform, as opposed to its previous placement in a premium package, allowing all subscribers to access the channel. Also, a two-hour timeshift channel launched on channel 162.

As for the films broadcast on the channel, the channel not only airs films from Universal Pictures, but also airs films from other distributors such as Paramount Pictures, DreamWorks Pictures, and Miramax Films.

Universal Channel HD
On 3 November 2014, Universal Channel launched a HD simulcast on Foxtel. In addition, it moved from channel 116 to channel 112 and Universal Channel + 2 moved from channel 162 to channel 155.
On 1 June 2018, Universal Channel became Universal TV.

Programming
Universal TV currently airs a variety of international programs, including:

Former Programming
Prior to the 2014 format, The channel aired content from the original American Hallmark Channel, selected telemovies from America and the UK, along with classic and contemporary Australian drama series from Southern Star Entertainment.
A list of Australian produced shows broadcast on Universal TV prior to the 2014 format include:
 A Country Practice
 All Saints (moved to 111)
 Always Greener
 Blue Heelers
 City Homicide
 The Librarians
 McLeod's Daughters
 Offspring
 Packed to the Rafters (moved to 111)
 Police Rescue
 Rake
 Rescue: Special Ops
 Rush
 SeaChange
 Sea Patrol
 Stingers
 The Secret Life of Us
 Water Rats

Availability
Universal TV is part of most satellite and cablepay television providers in Australia, usually included in an extra or add-on package. Providers include Foxtel, Austar, Optus TV and Neighbourhood Cable.

Ratings
Universal TV's ratings have increased from a 0.3% share in April 2007, to a 0.5% share in January 2010 (before the channel's re-branding). This is an 0.2% increase in almost 3 years.

See also
 Universal Channel
 Universal TV (New Zealand)
 13th Street
 Hallmark Channel (International)
 Universal Networks International

External links
Universal TV website (Australia)

References

Television networks in Australia
Television channels and stations established in 1998
English-language television stations in Australia